The flag of Togo is the national flag, ensign, and naval jack of Togo. It has five equal horizontal bands of green (top and bottom) alternating with yellow. There is a white five-pointed star on a red square in the upper hoist-side corner. It uses the pan-African colors of Ethiopia, but the design resembles the flag of Liberia, which itself echoes the flag of the United States, making it part of both the pan-African and Stars and Stripes flag families.

History 
The flag was designed by artist Paul Ahyi and approximates a golden rectangle closely. Ahyi was regarded as among the greatest of African artists of his generation. Born in Togo, Ahyi graduated from the École nationale supérieure des Beaux-Arts in Paris in 1959 and returned to Togo. He designed the flag of Togo while working on other contemporary works. The flag was adopted on 27 April 1960, and is still in use. During France's rule over Togo from 1957 to 1958, the flag of French Togo was used. After Togo's independence, the first Flag of Togo was used from 1958 to 1960.

Symbolism
The four colors (green, red, white and yellow) are the pan-African colors. 

The colors of the flag are meant to symbolize the following:
 Red represents blood shed by Martyrs to gain independence
 White star represents hope
 Green represents the forests, agriculture, nature, and overall hope for the future 
 Yellow represents the natural resources of the country

The five stripes represent the five regions of Togo.

Geometry
The sides of the flag of Togo are in the golden ratio , making the flag of Togo one out of the few national flags with irrational proportions.

Historical flags

See also
 Pan-African colours
 List of Togolese flags
 Coat of arms of Togo

References

Flags introduced in 1960
Flag
Flags of Africa
National flags